Stefano Boeri (born 25 November 1956) is an Italian architect and urban planner, and a founding partner of Stefano Boeri Architetti. Among his most known projects are the Vertical Forest in Milan, the Villa Méditerranée in Marseille, and the House of the Sea of La Maddalena. He is the professor of urban planning at the Polytechnic University of Milan.

Early life, education and academic career
Boeri was born into a bourgeois household in Milan, the son of Cini, an architect and designer, and Renato, a neurologist. His younger brother Tito is a leading welfare economist.

Boeri earned a master's degree in architecture in 1980 from the Polytechnic University of Milan and a PhD in Urban Planning in 1989 from Iuav University of Venice. While at university he was a member of the far-left Student Movement (Movimento Studentesco; MS), and was one of those involved in the attack on neo-fascist activist Antonio Braggion in April 1975, for which he and several other militants were later brought to trial and acquitted only by statute of limitations. Later on, Boeri's politics took a moderate turn, and in 2010 he was the defeated Democratic Party (PD) candidate in the centre-left open primary for the forthcoming mayoral election in Milan.

As well as his tenured position at the Polytechnic University of Milan, he has also been a visiting professor at many international universities, including the Harvard Graduate School of Design, the Berlage Institute in the Netherlands, and Columbia University.

Early career as architect
In 1993, Boeri founded a research agency for territorial investigation based in Milan, called Multiplicity, concerned about contemporary urbanism, architecture, visual arts and general culture, through which he promoted research and exhibitions on the transformation of the inhabited territories that have been presented in many museums and exhibition venues and international universities. Multiplicity was involved in three major research projects: “USE-Uncertain states of Europe”, a research on territorial transformations in contemporary Europe, presented for the first time as part of "Mutations" (Bordeaux, 2000); “Solid Sea”, a study of the Mediterranean presented at Documenta11 (Kassel, 2002); and “Border-Device(s)”, a research into the proliferation of controversial boundaries in the contemporary world, produced within the exhibition "Territories" at Berlin Kunst Werke and Utopia Station (Venice Biennale of Contemporary Art, 2003).

From 2004 to 2007 Boeri was the editor-in-chief of the international magazine Domus, and from 2007 to 2011 he edited Abitare magazine.

Recent projects
In the period between April 2011 and March 2013 Boeri was appointed Head of Culture, Design and Fashion for the city of Milan, developing projects such as Piano City Milano and Book City Milano, both of which are still celebrated on a yearly basis; contemporary art exhibitions for internationally renowned artists, such as Marina Abramovic’s performance of The Abramovic Method in PAC (Padiglione d’Arte Contemporanea); an Alberto Garutti retrospective; and a Jeff Wall exhibition entitled “Actuality”. All this was in addition to the major and classical exhibitions of Picasso at the Palazzo Reale (the most visited exhibition in Italy in the year 2012 ), the show Bramantino a Milano at the “Castello Sforzesco”, and efforts to improve and relocate the exhibition of “La Pieta Rondanini”, one of Michelangelo’s last sculptures dated to 1552.

In 2011, he was curator for the research "Sao Paulo Calling", promoted for the Housing Secretary of São Paulo, which organised an extensive international network of research on the phenomenon of informal settlements in São Paulo and around the world, such as Rome, Nairobi, Medellin, Mumbai, Moscow and Baghdad.

Since 2013 he has been the artistic director of MI/ARCH, an international festival of architecture promoted by the Polytechnic University of Milan. To date, it has involved more than 60 speakers ranging between architects, artist, and photographers, among which are Renzo Piano, Rem Koolhaas, Elizabeth Diller, Steven Holl, and many others. He was also the artistic director of the International Festival of Architecture FESTARCH, which was held in Cagliari (2008 and 2009) and Perugia (2011 and 2012).

In the period between July 2014 and October 2015 Boeri was Councillor for Culture and Major Events for the Mayor of Florence, Dario Nardella, and was in charge of the Artistic Direction of the “Estate Fiorentina 2014”, an urban summer festival with live music, theatre performances, and several cultural projects by local organisations.

He was also the founder and director of the web platform theTomorrow (www.thetomorrowlab.net), which promotes an exchange of ideas on European culture, and part of the scientific board of the Galleria Degli Uffizi in Florence, Italy, a palace and Italian classical art museum, along with Davide Gasparotto, senior curator of the paintings department at The J. Paul Getty Museum, and Carl Brandon Strehlke, curator emeritus of the Philadelphia Museum of Art.

Stefano Boeri Architetti
Boeri founded in 1999 the Boeri Studio with Gianandrea Barreca and Giovanni La Varra, that in 2009 became Stefano Boeri Architetti, in partnership with Michele Brunello. SBA is currently based in Milan, Shanghai, and Doha, Qatar, researching and practicing contemporary architecture and urbanism, with a focus on biodiversity and sustainable architecture. Stefano Boeri Architetti has recently completed the Vertical Forest, two sustainable residential towers based on urban biodiversity in Milan; New General Hospital, a large scale renovation of one of the most prominent medical centres in Milan; CERBA, the master plan of the European Centre for Advanced Medical Research. Stefano Boeri Architetti is also curating Skolkovo innovation center in Moscow, together with Jean Pistre, Speech, David Chipperfield, Mohsen Mostafavi, Kazuyo Sejima, OMA, Herzog & de Meuron and it is developing the detailed masterplan of D4 district with the Moscow-based studio Project Meganom. Stefano Boeri has developed various plans for the reconversion of European waterfronts (Genoa, Naples, Trieste, Cagliari, Salonika, Mytilene) and historical industrial plants redevelopment as the project for Villa Méditerranée, opened in 2013 for Marseilles European Capital of Culture. Stefano Boeri Architetti has recently completed CASA ITALO, designing all lounges and customer areas for the high speed train company NTV, the renovation of old Arsenal at La Maddalena, Sardinia, an intervention that reclaimed a 155.000 sqm abandoned and contaminated area to a new nautical, touristic and convention centre; RCS Corriere della Sera Headquarter (building A2). Stefano Boeri Architetti has developed the guidelines of Milan Expo 2015 concept-masterplan, together with Richard Burdett, Jacques Herzog and William MacDonough.

Past projects in Italy include the research of a low cost and environmentally sustainable social housing model: CASABOSCO, the interior design for the stations of the new Italian private railway company NTV, the new headquarters for RCS - Corriere della Sera - the most important newspaper in Italy, and the renovation of TELECOM headquarters in Rome.

Recently SBA was selected with three other teams by the Egyptian Government to redesign the triangle of Maspero in the heart of downtown Cairo, developing a series of new towers and public facilities along the Nile waterfront. The studio is also engage to develop a new general plans in 2016, the first one  is a strategic vision for Tirana as a metropolitan entity (being the widest national and territorial urban reform in Albania in the last 25 years)  and the new urban plan for the Republic of San Marino.

Stefano Boeri Architetti is also promoting cultural events and its projects have been shown in international expositions as Venice Biennale, Beijing Design Week, Milan Furniture Fair, Kunst-Werke Institute for Contemporary Art and Musée d'Art Moderne de la Ville de Paris and published on international magazines such as: A+U, Domus, Abitare, AREA, ARCHIS, ICON, Lotus, 2G, MIT Press, Harvard Design Magazine, Financial Times, Elle, La Repubblica. Stefano Boeri received international prizes and recognitions.

Selected works
Bosco Verticale (Vertical Forest) is a model for sustainable residential buildings. A project for metropolitan reforestation that regenerates the environment and the urban biodiversity without expanding the city upon the territory. Vertical Forest is a model of vertical densification of nature within the city. The first unit of Vertical Forest is formed by two residential towers, 119 and 87 meters high, realized in the centre of Milan Isola neighbourhood, that will host 900 trees and over 2000 plants from a wide range of floral species distributed in relation to the façade position towards the sun. The project, inaugurated in October 2104, was awarded the 2014 International Highrise Award and  the 2015 CTBUH Award, as Best Tall Building Worldwide sponsored by the Council for Tall Building and Urban Habitat and the Illinois Institute of Technology  The project was developed and followed by ex firm partners Gianandrea Barreca and Giovanni La Varra. After this first sustainable model of housing, the studio recently won a competition, in Lausanne, Switzerland, to further develop this model and build a new 117 meters tall residential tower, which will host more than 100 cedar trees and will be covered by shrubs and plants over an area of 3.000 sqm, which construction is scheduled to start in 2017.
Villa Méditerranée opened in 2013 for Marseilles European Capital of Culture as the new Centre Régional de la Méditerranée in Marseille, France. The multifunctional building overlooking the Port of Marseille docks, 9,000sqm, the project points the sea as its space of reference. The seawater is brought into the project through an artificial dock, between the suspended cantilever of 36m and the underwater conference center. The water plaza enclosed in the building interior lounge is the public space that represents the power of the sea.
In December 2020, Boeri and a group of consultants unveiled the designs of 1500 timber vaccination pavilions, adorned with a flower graphic meant to symbolize regeneration, that will be installed around Italy starting January 2021.

Bibliography
A vertical forest. Corraini Edizioni, Mantova, 2015.
Fare di più con meno.   Il Saggiatore, Milan, 2012
Biomilano. Glossary of Ideas for a Metropolis based around Bio-Diversity.   Corraini, Mantova, 2011.
Anticittà.   Laterza, Bari, 2011.
Effetto Maddalena. Maddalena Effect.   Rizzoli, Milano, 2010.
Cronache dell’abitare.   Mondadori, Milano, 2007.
Il territorio che cambia.   Associazione Interessi  Metropolitani  1993, con Arturo Lanzani e Edoardo Marini.
Mutations .  Actar, Barcelona 2000, with Rem Koolhaas, Hans Ulrich Obrist, Sandford Kwinter
USE Uncertain States of Europe.   Skirà, Milan, 2002.

References

External links 
 Stefano Boeri
 Stefano Boeri Architetti
 Festarch

1956 births
Living people
21st-century Italian architects
Architects from Milan
Polytechnic University of Milan alumni
Domus (magazine) editors
Italian architecture writers